Rosemary is a comedy by English playwright  Louis N. Parker and English playwright and actor Murray Carson. In America, it opened at Charles Frohman's Empire Theatre on Broadway in the August 1896.  A film version was produced in 1915.

Original Broadway Cast

References

American plays
1896 plays